Gunnestad Glacier is a glacier  long, flowing north between Mount Widerøe and Mount Walnum in the Sør Rondane Mountains of Antarctica. It was mapped by Norwegian cartographers in 1957 from air photos taken by U.S. Navy Operation Highjump, 1946–47, and named for Lieutenant Alf Gunnestad, a pilot with the Norwegian expedition under Lars Christensen, 1933–34.

See also
 List of glaciers in the Antarctic
 Glaciology

References

Glaciers of Queen Maud Land
Princess Ragnhild Coast